"Friends" is a song written by Johnny Slate and Danny Morrison, and recorded by American country music artist Razzy Bailey.  It was released in March 1981 as the first single and partial title track from his album Makin' Friends.  "Friends" was released as a double-sided single, with "Anywhere There's a Jukebox" on the b-side. Both sides of the single peaked at Number One on the Hot Country Songs charts dated for June 6, 1981.

Charts

References

1981 singles
Razzy Bailey songs
Songs written by Danny Morrison (songwriter)
Songs written by Johnny Slate
Song recordings produced by Bob Montgomery (songwriter)
RCA Records singles
1981 songs